Fellows of the Royal Society, elected in 1990.

Fellows

Roger Angel
Michael Ashburner
David Bohm (1917–1992)
David Brown
Malcolm H. Chisholm
Robin Clark
Peter Clarricoats
John G. Collier (1935–1995)
Simon Conway Morris
Andrew Crawford
Leslie Dutton
Robert Fettiplace
Erwin Gabathuler
Nicholas C. Handy (1941–2012)
Allen Hill (1937–2021)
Jonathan Hodgkin
Eric Jakeman
George Jellicoe, 2nd Earl Jellicoe (1918–2007)
Dame Louise Johnson (1940–2012)
Vaughan Jones
Dame Carole Jordan
John Knott
Sir Harry Kroto
Steven V. Ley
Lew Mander
Michael E. McIntyre
Derek W. Moore (1931–2008)
Colin James Pennycuick
John Albert Raven
Sir David Read
Man Mohan Sharma
Allan Snyder
George Stark
Azim Surani
Bob Vaughan
Herman Waldmann
William Lionel Wilkinson
Alan Williams (1945–1992)
Robin Williams
Sir Greg Winter
Semir Zeki

Foreign members

Edward Norton Lorenz  (1917–2008)
Yasutomi Nishizuka  (1932–2004)
Christiane Nusslein-Volhard
Bengt I. Samuelsson
Lyman Spitzer  (1914–1997)
E. O. Wilson

References

1990 in science
1990
1990 in the United Kingdom